Gergely Bornemissza (1526, Pécs – 1555, Constantinople) was a Hungarian soldier and national hero.

Not much is known of his early life, although he is known to have been married twice.  He is believed to have been an educated man, and a Lutheran.

He is mainly known for his role as an explosives expert in the Siege of Eger (1552).

After the siege, he was given command of the Castle of Eger.  In 1554 he was captured by the Turks, and was executed by hanging in Constantinople after he refused to betray secrets about the defences at Eger.

He is the hero of Géza Gárdonyi's novel Eclipse of the Crescent Moon.

References 
Cushing, George: Introduction to Corvina edition of Eclipse of the Crescent Moon
Csiffáry, Gergely: Bornemissza Gergely deák életrajza. Veres, Gábor szerk.: Agria 45. (Az Egri Múzeum Évkönyve - Annales Musei Agriensis, 2009)
Sugár, István: Bornemissza Gergely deák élete
 

Hungarian soldiers
1526 births
1555 deaths
People executed by the Ottoman Empire by hanging
16th-century executions by the Ottoman Empire
Hungarian people executed abroad
Hungarian Lutherans
16th-century Hungarian nobility
People from Pécs